Pukekohe railway station is a railway station in Pukekohe, New Zealand. It is the southern terminus (but not for electric services) of the Southern Line of the Auckland railway network. The station has an island platform between the main lines and an original wooden station building complete with signal panel.

In 1913 the station was rebuilt to the south, away from the town centre and it was converted to an island platform in 1941 and rebuilt again from 2016.

History

The railway from Ōtāhuhu reached West Pukekohe in 1873 and the line opened to Mercer on 20 May 1875, though initially there was no goods service. The station caused the town centre to be refocused along King Street. A rimu and kauri 4th class station and stationmaster's house were built in 1875. In 1902 the station had an iron roof and contained a ladies' waiting room, public vestibule, railway and postal room, and porter's room. There were four sidings in connection with the station, and the staff consisted of the stationmaster, two cadets, a messenger, and a porter. There was a Post Office at the station from 1883 to 1909, though a conflict between the departments in 1883. Further railway houses were added in 1909, 1911 and 1955.

A wooden section of platform was replaced by bitumen in 1936.

In 1986 the footbridge was shortened and it was proposed to close the station to goods in less than wagon loads and in 1987 tenders were called for removal of the goods shed.

Upgrades 
A new class B station was built in 1913 and part of the old station was used as a goods office.

The  of track from Paerata, through Pukekohe to Tuakau was doubled from 21 November 1954. Work had started on the doubling in 1938 and the station at Pukekohe converted to an island platform in 1941.

Patronage 
The table and graph below show a slow growth in passenger numbers, with a peak during World War 2. At 269,000, the current numbers far exceed even that 1943 peak of 155,392, but Pukekohe's population has grown from 3,610 in 1947 to 11,676 in 2018. However, there were fewer than 100 passengers a day in 2001, but numbers rose rapidly to over 500 by 2011.

Pukekohe Racecourse 
Franklin Racecourse station, to the south of Pukekohe, was open from about 1921 to 1955.

Services
In 1875 Pukekohe had two trains a day in each direction taking about 2 hours from Auckland. In 2019 journeys to Auckland took 1hr 11mins, running half hourly.

Since 2000, the country town of Pukekohe has been the southern terminus for the Southern Line. However suburban trains start or terminate at the former terminus at Papakura (18.2 km north of Pukekohe) because network electrification does not extend beyond Papakura. An hourly diesel train shuttle service has operated between Pukekohe and Papakura since July 2015, when EMU electric services were inaugurated for Southern Line services.

ADL class DMUs are utilized for the shuttle. The trains are stabled at Pukekohe station and Westfield depot overnight. In December 2014, the SX train (minus locomotives) and an ADK set (both decommissioned from service following the introduction of EMUs on the Auckland network) were relocated to Pukekohe for storage pending disposal. The stored trains were later relocated to Waitakere and Helensville, and then back to Westfield.

In December 2014, service frequency of the shuttle service was increased to hourly on all days, including weekend services for the first time.

Bus routes 391, 392, 393, 394, 396, 398 and 399 serve Pukekohe Station.

Upgrade 
In 2011, the Auckland Council agreed to fund an upgrade to the station, along with the construction of a Park and ride facility. In 2014 Auckland Transport announced plans to upgrade Pukekohe station in two stages, with the first stage in 2015 to include a bus interchange and a Park and Ride. The upgrade also included replacement of the wooden sections of platform and a new footbridge and lifts.

Auckland Transport also added a proposal to extend railway electrification to Pukekohe to its 10-year plan.

Electrification of the rail line from Papakura to Pukekohe was announced in 2020; with the upgrade then planned to be completed by 2021 (see also New Zealand Upgrade Programme and Auckland railway electrification).

Electrification work is to commence in 2020 (with three new stations proposed on the route).

To provide space for stabling trains, KiwiRail planned to remove, or demolish, the 1913 station building by November 2021. A 2019 report said that relocating the station would be impractical and could cost almost $2.7m. It has been described as, "one of Pukekohe’s more important heritage buildings". In December 2021, it was announced that the station would be relocated to Matangi for preservation.

From 13 August 2022, KiwiRail is redeveloping Pukekohe station and the rail line to allow for Auckland Transport's electric trains to travel between Pukekohe and Papakura. Pukekohe Station is closed and the Pukekohe train service is suspended until late 2024.

Bus station
The $15.4 million upgrade, with a new park and ride area, improved bus station facilities and a pedestrian overbridge at the new integrated bus and train station, began construction in July 2017. The 6-bay bus station opened on 6 June 2018.

See also 
 List of Auckland railway stations
 Public transport in Auckland

References

External links 

 1905 photo of station

Rail transport in the Auckland Region
Buildings and structures in the Auckland Region
Railway stations in New Zealand
Railway stations opened in 1875